Shin Dong-mi (born 29 November 1977) is a South Korean actress.

Career 
She made her debut as a theater actor in 1998. The following year, she started to act as a musical actor in 1999, and then she started her career as a TV actress in 2001 and laer made her film debut in a supporting role in Don't Look Back  (2006). She had her first leading role in Lee Kwang-kuk's highly acclaimed debut Romance Joe (2002). She starred as a lead in Lee's second feature A Matter of Interpretation (2015) again and earned acclaim for her calibrated and humorous performance. More recently, she has appeared in drama titles such as  Avengers Social Club (2017),  Liver or Die (2019),  Doctor John (TV series) (2019),  Hi Bye, Mama! (2020) and Record of Youth (2020).

Personal life 
Shin studied theater in Dankook University. She married musical actor and singer Hur Gyu on December 8, 2014. They have released a song together titled Dream of a Doll and Feel so good and also performed together on Immortal Songs: Singing the Legend.

Filmography

Television series

Film

Awards and nominations

References

External links 
 
 
 
 

1977 births
Living people
South Korean film actresses
South Korean television actresses
Dankook University alumni